Alacakaya is a town of Elazığ Province of Turkey. It is the seat of Alacakaya District. Its population is 2,451 (2021). The mayor is Başaran Yaşlı (Independent).

Neighbourhoods
The municipality consists of the following neighbourhoods:
 Altıncanak 
 Altıoluk 
 Güleman 
 Gündoğdu
 Merkez
 Sularbaşı

References

Towns in Turkey
Populated places in Elazığ Province
Alacakaya District
Kurdish settlements in Elazığ Province